The 2008 Walsh Cup was a hurling competition played by the teams of Leinster GAA and two teams from Ulster GAA.  The competition differs from the Leinster Senior Hurling Championship as it also features further education colleges and it also featured two teams from Ulster. The first four losers of the competition entered the Walsh Shield.

Antrim won their first and (so far) only Walsh Cup, while Laois won the Walsh Shield.

Walsh Cup

Preliminary round

Quarter-finals

Semi-final

Final

Walsh Shield
Kilkenny and Dublin declined to compete.

Semi-final

Final

References

Walsh Cup
Walsh Cup (hurling)